The Lebanese Civil War was a multi-sided military conflict that pitted a variety of local irregular militias, both Muslim and Christian, against each other between 1975 and 1990. 
A wide variety of weapons were used by the different armies and factions operating in the Lebanese Civil War. Combatants included:
 the leftist-Muslim militias of the Lebanese National Movement (LNM) coalition (1975 – 1982):
 the Sunni Muslim Independent Nasserite Movement's Al-Mourabitoun militia (1975 – 1988);
 the Sunni Muslim Popular Nasserist Organization's National Liberation Army (NLA) militia (1975 – 1991);
 the Sunni Muslim Toilers League's Zafer el-Khatib Forces (ZKF) militia (1974 – 1991);
 the Druze Progressive Socialist Party's People's Liberation Army (Druze PLA) militia (1975 – 1991);
 the Sixth of February Movement militia (1975 – 1986);
 the Union of Working People's Forces's (UWPF) Victory Divisions militia (1965 – 1990);
 the Union of Working People's Forces-Corrective Movement's (UWPF-CM) Nasser's Forces militia (1975 – 1990);
 the Communist Action Organization in Lebanon (OCAL) militia (1975 – 1991);
 the Lebanese Communist Party's Popular Guard militia (1970 – 2000);
 the Arab Socialist Ba'ath Party's Assad Battalion militia (1966 – present);
 the Syrian Social Nationalist Party (SSNP) militia (1932 – present);
 the Najjadeh Party militia (1936 – present);
 the Shia Muslim Knights of Ali militia (1967 – 1976);
 the Muslim Lebanese Arab Army (LAA), dissident faction of the Lebanese Army (1976 – 1977); 
 the rightist-Christian militias of the Lebanese Front coalition (1976 – 1980):
 the Christian Kataeb Regulatory Forces (KRF) militia (1961 – 1980);
 the Christian Al-Tanzim militia (1969 – 1990);
 the Christian Guardians of the Cedars (GoC) militia (1974 – 2000);
 the Christian Tigers Militia (a.k.a. Al-Noumour, Noumour Al-Ahrar, Noumours, NLP Tigers) militia (1968 – 1991);
 the Christian Zgharta Liberation Army (ZLA, a.k.a. Al-Marada, Marada Brigade, Mardaite Brigade) militia (1967 – 1991);
 the Christian Tyous Team of Commandos (TTC, a.k.a. "Tyous" for short, also translated as the "Stubborn Ones" or "Les Têtus", "Les Obstinés") militia (1975 – 1985); 
 the Christian Lebanese Youth Movement (LYM, a.k.a. Maroun Khoury Group – MKG) militia (1975 – 1977);
 the Christian Young Men militia (1978 – 1986);
 the Christian Zahliote Group (ZG, a.k.a. Groupement Zahliote – GZ) militia (1975 – 1981);
 the Christian Shuraya Party's Assyrian Battalion (AB) militia (1978 – 1981);
 the Christian Maronite Monks militia (1975 – 1980);
 the Christian Maronite League militia (1952 – present);
 the Christian Army of Free Lebanon (AFL), dissident faction of the Lebanese Army (1976 – 1978);
 the Christian Lebanese Forces militia (LF), successor of the Lebanese Front and the KRF militia (1977 – 1994);
 the Christian Lebanese Forces – Executive Command (LFEC) militia, dissident faction of the LF (1985 – 1991);
 the Druze Vanguard of the Maani Army (Movement of the Druze Jihad) (VMA – MDJ) militia (1976 – 1978);
 the Kurdish Democratic Party – Lebanon (KDP-L) militia (1975 – 1991);
 the Armenian Secret Army for the Liberation of Armenia (ASALA) urban guerrilla group (1975 – 1991);
 the Alawite Arab Democratic Party's Arab Red Knights (ARK) militia (1981 – 1991);
 the Shia Muslim Amal Movement militia (1975 – present);
 the Shia Muslim Islamic Jihad Organization (IJO) urban guerrilla group (1983 – 1992);
 the Shia Muslim Hezbollah guerrilla group (1985 – present);
 the Sunni Muslim Islamic Unification Movement (IUM, a.k.a. Al-Tawheed) militia (1982 – present);
 the United Nasserite Organization (UNO) guerrilla group (1986 – 1991);
 the Lebanese Armed Revolutionary Factions (LARF) urban guerrilla group (1979 – 1988);
 the Lebanese Liberation Front (LLF) urban guerrilla group (1987 – 1989);
 the Popular Revolutionary Resistance Organization (PRRO) urban guerrilla group (1987 – 1990);
 the Front for the Liberation of Lebanon from Foreigners (FLLF) urban guerrilla group (1980 – 1983);
 the Liberation Battalion urban guerrilla group (1987 – 1988);
 the Sons of the South (SotS) guerrilla group (1983 – 1995);
 the South Lebanon Army (SLA) militia (1978 – 2000); 
 the official Lebanese Armed Forces (LAF) and the Internal Security Forces (ISF), led by the Lebanese government;
 the mainstream Palestinian guerrilla factions of the Palestine Liberation Organization (PLO) and the breakaway Rejectionist Front (present in Lebanon from 1968 to 1983); 
 the Palestine Liberation Army (present in Lebanon from 1976 to 1990);
 the Syrian Army (present in Lebanon from 1976 to 2005); 
 the Israel Defense Forces (IDF) (present in Lebanon from 1978 to 2000); 
 in between, a plethora of irregular Lebanese armed groups that emerged from the wrecks of both the LNM and the Lebanese Front alliances, after their collapse in the early 1980s.

Weapons and equipment
The list below comprises all the weapons and equipment employed by the LNM, Lebanese Front, LAA, AFL, LF, IUM, Hezbollah, Al-Mourabitoun, NLA, Druze PLA, SLA, LAF, ISF, and lesser Lebanese groups (note: the Syrian Army, PLO, Palestinian PLA and IDF are not included on this list).

Pistols and revolvers

Smith & Wesson Model 10 revolver
Smith & Wesson Model 13 revolver
Smith & Wesson Model 14 revolver
Smith & Wesson Model 15 revolver
Smith & Wesson Model 17 revolver
Smith & Wesson Model 19 revolver
Colt Single Action Army second generation revolver
Colt Cobra .38 Special snub-nose revolver
Mauser C96 "broomhandle" pistol
Mauser HSc pistol
Mauser M2 semi-automatic handgun
Luger pistol
Walther P38 pistol
Walther PPK pistol
Heckler & Koch VP 70 pistol
Heckler & Koch P7 pistol
Heckler & Koch P9 pistol
SIG P210 pistol
SIG-Sauer P220 and P225 pistols
Astra A-80 pistol
Astra A-90 pistol
Astra A-100 pistol
Llama M82 pistol
Star A, B, B Super, and P pistols
Star 30M pistol
Star Ultrastar, Firestar and Megastar pistols
Taurus PT92, PT99, and PT100 pistols
Beretta M1951 pistol
Beretta 85, 86, 87 and 89 pistols
MAB PA-15 pistol
Colt M1911A1 Semi-Automatic Pistol
Para-Ordnance P14-45 (Canadian-produced version of the M1911A1 pistol)
FN Browning M1910 and M1922 pistols
FN Browning Hi-Power pistol
FN Browning BDM pistol
FN Browning BDA380 pistol
FN Browning HP-DA/BDA9 pistol
Tokarev TT-33 pistol
Makarov PM/PMM pistol
CZ 52 pistol
CZ 75 pistol
CZ 82/83 pistol
CZ 85 pistol

Submachine guns

MP 40
PPD-40
PPSh-41
Beretta M38/44 Found in a weapon cache.
M1A1 Thompson
Crvena Zastava Automat M56 (Yugoslavian-produced submachine gun similar in design to the German MP 40)  
MAT-49
OTs-02 Kiparis
Sa 25/26
Sten Mk V 
Sterling L2A3/Mark 4 submachine gun
L34A1/Mk.5 Sterling-Patchett (sound-suppressed version of the Sterling L2A3)
Carl Gustaf m/45 (or its Egyptian-produced version, dubbed the "Port Said")
Škorpion vz. 61
Spectre M4
Walther MPL
Beretta Model 12
Steyr MPi 69 (Austrian-produced submachine gun similar in design to the Israeli Uzi)
Uzi (MP-2, Mini Uzi, and Micro Uzi variants)
MAC-10 Machine pistol
MAC-11 Machine pistol (sub-compact version of the MAC-10)
Heckler & Koch MP5
Heckler & Koch MP5K (shortened version of the MP5)

Bolt-action rifles
Lee-Enfield
Pattern 1914 Enfield
Lebel Model 1886 rifle
Berthier 1907/15 - M16 Lebel rifle
Berthier 1892 M16 cavalry carbine
MAS-36 rifle
Mauser Model 1888 commission rifle
Mauser Gewehr 98
Mauser Karabiner 98k
Mannlicher–Carcano Modello 1891 infantry rifle
Mosin–Nagant

Semi-automatic rifles

MAS-49 and MAS-49/56 rifles
M1 Garand (or its Italian-produced copy, the Beretta Model 1952)
SKS
Vz. 52 rifle
M14 rifle
Beretta BM 59 (Italian-produced semi-automatic rifle similar in design to the M14)

Carbines
 
M2 carbine
CAR-15 Assault carbine
AMD-65
FN CAL
SIG SG 543 carbine

Assault rifles

Sturmgewehr 44 assault rifle
AK-47 assault rifle (other variants included the AKM, AK-74, the Hungarian AK-63, the Yugoslav Zastava M70 and Zastava M80, the Polish PMK-DGN-60, Chinese Type 56, North Korean Type 58 and Type 68, the Romanian Pistol Mitralieră model 1963/1965 and AIM, Bulgarian AKK/AKKS, and former East German MPi-KM and MPi-KMS-72 assault rifles)
Vz. 58
FN FAL 
ROMAT (Israeli-produced 'lightened' version of the FN FAL battle rifle)
M16A1
M16A2
ArmaLite AR-18
Norinco CQ
CETME Model C (Spanish-produced assault rifle similar in design to the German Heckler & Koch G3)
Heckler & Koch G3
Heckler & Koch HK33
Heckler & Koch G41
Heckler & Koch G53
SIG SG 540 and SIG SG 542 assault rifles

Sniper rifles

Lee-Enfield (equipped with telescopic sights)
FN FAL (equipped with telescopic sights)
Heckler & Koch G3 (equipped with telescopic sights)
M16A1 (equipped with telescopic sights; not very effective)
SIG SG 542 (equipped with telescopic sights)
FR F1
Dragunov SVD-63
Tabuk Sniper Rifle
Zastava M76/M78
M21 Sniper Weapon System
M40 rifle
Remington Model 700
Savage 10FP/110FP
PSL Sniper Rifle
SSG 82
Steyr SSG 69
Enfield L42A1 (military version) and Enforcer (Police version) rifles
Heckler & Koch PSG1
PTRS-41 14.5mm anti-tank rifle (used for heavy sniping)

Shotguns
Winchester Model 1200
Mossberg 500 12-gauge (20.2mm)
Remington Model 870 Police Magnum 12-gauge (20.2mm)
Franchi SPAS-12 semi-automatic
Franchi SPAS-15 semi-automatic

Light machine guns

M1918A2 BAR
Bren Mk. I .303 (7.7mm)
RPK
Zastava M77 (Yugoslav-produced version of the RPK)
RPD 
DP-28
Heckler & Koch HK21
FN FAL 50-41 Heavy Barrel (HB) 
MAKLEON (Israeli-produced version of the FN FAL 50-41 HB)

General-purpose machine guns

MG 34
MG 42 
Rheinmetall MG 3 
PK/PKM
Type 80 (Chinese-produced version of the PK/PKM)
Zastava M84 (Yugoslav-produced version of the PK/PKM)
UK vz. 59
Type 67
AA-52 (mainly mounted on AML armoured cars and VAB APCs)
FN MAG
M60

Medium machine gun and Heavy machine guns

Besa Mark III 7.92mm (mounted on Technicals)
Browning M1919A4 .30 Cal (mounted on Technicals, armoured cars, tanks, and APCs)
SG-43/SGM Goryunov (mounted on Technicals, tanks and APCs)
Type 53/57 (Chinese variant of the SG-43 and SGM)
DShKM 12.7mm Heavy machine gun (mainly mounted on Technicals, tanks and APCs)
Vz. 38/46 (Czechoslovakian variant of the DShKM)
Type 54 (Chinese variant of the DShKM)
Type 77 12.7mm Heavy machine gun
NSV 12.7mm Heavy machine gun (taken off from disabled tanks and re-mounted on Technicals)
Zastava M87 (Yugoslav variant of the NSV mounted on Technicals)
KPV 14.5mm Heavy machine gun (mounted on Technicals)
Browning M2HB .50 Cal (mounted on Technicals, tanks, and APCs)
AN/M2 aircraft gun (version of the Browning M2HB mounted on Technicals and armoured cars)

Grenade systems
Mark 2 Fragmentation Hand/Rifle Grenade
M61 Fragmentation Hand Grenade 
M67 grenade
M18 smoke grenade
M5 grenade
M26 grenade
Type 67 stick granade
F1 hand grenade
RG-4 anti-personnel grenade
RG-42 hand grenade
RGD-5 hand grenade
RPG-43 anti-tank grenade
RKG-3 anti-tank grenade 
PGN-60 anti-tank rifle grenade
M60 rifle grenade
AC58 rifle grenade
APAV40 rifle grenade
M52 rifle grenade
STRIM 65 rifle grenade
Mecar R1A1 Super Energa rifle grenade
Mecar BTU rifle grenade
FN Telgren rifle grenade

Land mine systems
M18A1 Claymore anti-personnel mine
M14 anti-personnel mine 
No. 3 anti-personnel mine 
No. 4/4A anti-personnel mine 
No. 4 enhanced anti-personnel mine 
No. 10 anti-personnel mine 
PMD-6/6M anti-personnel mine 
PMN 2 anti-personnel mine 
Type 72A/B anti-personnel mine 
GYATA 64 anti-personnel mine 
Mi Ap ID Mle 51 anti-personnel mine 
Mi Ap DV Mle 59 anti-personnel mine 
MAPS anti-personnel mine 
VS 50 anti-personnel mine 
PRB M35 anti-personnel mine 
TM-46/TMN-46 anti-tank mine 
TM-57 anti-tank mine 
TM-62M anti-tank mine 
TMA-3 anti-tank mine 
TMA-4 anti-tank mine 
TMA-5 anti-tank mine 
M6A1 anti-tank mine 
M7A1 anti-tank mine 
M15 anti-tank mine 
M19 anti-tank mine 
PRB M3 anti-tank mine 
Mk 7 anti-tank mine 
TC/6 anti-tank mine

Anti-tank rocket and grenade launchers

M9A1 Bazooka 80mm
88.9mm Instalaza M65 (Spanish improved variant of the US M20 "Super Bazooka" 3.5 inch) 
LRAC Mle 50 73mm (French-produced anti-tank rocket launcher developed from the German Panzerschreck)
RL-83 Blindicide anti-tank rocket launcher
M72 LAW
M80 Zolja 64mm (Yugoslav-produced anti-tank rocket launcher similar to the M72 LAW)
RPG-2 rocket-propelled grenade launcher.
RPG-7 rocket-propelled grenade launcher.
Type 69 RPG rocket-propelled grenade launcher
M47 Dragon 
CMS B-300 83mm reusable man-portable anti-tank weapon system
ENTAC
MILAN (mounted on Technicals and M113 APCs)
BGM-71 TOW (mounted on Technicals and M113 APCs)
AT-3 Sagger
M203 grenade launcher 
M79 grenade launcher

Recoilless rifles

Type 36 57mm (Chinese-produced version of the shoulder-fired US M18 recoilless rifle)
M2 Carl Gustaf 84mm (shoulder-fired)
M67 90mm (shoulder-fired)
B-10 82mm (mounted on Technicals)
B-11 107mm (mounted on Technicals)
SPG-9 73mm (mounted on Technicals)
Type 56 75mm (Chinese variant of the US M20 recoilless rifle)
M40A1 106mm (mounted on Technicals, M113, AMX-VCI, and VAB APCs)
L6 Wombat 120mm (mounted on Technicals)

Mortars

Type E1 51mm Light mortar
L16 81mm mortar
Thomson-Brandt MO-60-L 60mm light mortar
M224 60mm lightweight mortar (LWCMS)
M2 60mm mortar
M29 81mm mortar
82-PM-41 82mm mortar
2B14-1 Podnos 82mm mortar
M30 4.2 inch (106.7mm) mortar
M1938 107mm mortar
Hotchkiss-Brandt TDA MO-120-RT-61 120mm towed heavy mortar
120-PM-38 (M-1938) 120mm heavy mortar
120-PM-43 (M-1943) 120mm heavy mortar
Soltam M-65 120mm heavy mortar (mostly mounted on M3/M9 half-tracks and modified M113 APCs)
Soltam M-66 160mm heavy mortar (mostly mounted on M3/M9 half-tracks and Makmat mortar carriers)
MT-13 (M1943) 160mm heavy mortar
2S4 240mm towed breech-loading heavy mortar

Rocket and missile systems
 

DKB Grad-P 122mm Light portable rocket system
BM-11 122mm multiple rocket launcher (North Korean 30-tube version of the BM-21 Grad mounted on a unlicensed copy of the Japanese-manufactured Isuzu HTS12G 2.5 ton truck)
BM-13 122mm multiple rocket launcher
BM-21 Grad 122mm multiple rocket launcher
RL-21 (Sakr-36) 122mm multiple rocket launcher (Egyptian 30-tube version of the BM-11 mounted on a Soviet-manufactured ZIL-157 general-purpose truck)
APR-40/RO-40 128mm multiple rocket launcher
BM-12 107mm towed multiple rocket launcher (mounted on Technicals)
BM-14 140mm towed multiple rocket launcher (mounted on Technicals)
Type 63 107mm towed multiple rocket launcher (Chinese version of the BM-12 mounted on Technicals)
Type 81 140mm towed multiple rocket launcher (Chinese version of the BM-14 mounted on Technicals)
FIM-43 Redeye surface-to-air missile 
SA-7 Grail surface-to-air missile
Frog-7 short-range artillery rocket
SS.11 anti-tank missile (mounted on ACMAT TPK 4.20-NA12 trucks and Gazelle helicopter gunships)
SS.12 anti-tank missile (mounted on ACMAT TPK 4.20-NA12 trucks and Gazelle helicopter gunships)
HOT anti-tank missile (mounted on Gazelle helicopter gunships)
SNEB 68mm rocket projectile
Homebuilt short-range rockets (fired from a adapted ZPU-4 AA gun mount installed on Unimog light trucks)

Anti-tank guns

ZiS-2 57mm anti-tank gun
ZiS-3 76.2mm anti-tank gun
D-44 85mm anti-tank gun
D-48 85mm towed anti-tank gun
DEFA D921/GT-2 90mm towed anti-tank gun (mounted on M3/M9 half tracks)

Anti-aircraft guns and Autocannons

M1939 (61-K) 37mm anti-aircraft gun (mounted on Unimog light trucks)
AZP S-60 57mm anti-aircraft gun
Bofors 40mm L/60 anti-aircraft gun (mounted on cargo trucks and BTR-152 APCs)
M621 20mm chain-fed cannon (installed on Gazelle helicopter gunships)
Zastava M55 A2 20mm autocannon (mostly mounted on technicals, cargo trucks and M113 APCs) 
Hispano-Suiza HS.661 30mm autocannon
ZPU (ZPU-1, ZPU-2, ZPU-4) 14.5mm autocannons (mostly mounted on technicals, M113 APCs and M3/M9 half tracks) 
ZU-23-2 23mm autocannon (mostly mounted on technicals, cargo trucks, M113 and BTR-152 APCs)
Type 85/YW 306 23mm autocannon (Chinese-produced version of the ZU-23-2, mounted on technicals, cargo trucks and M113 APCs)

Howitzers

QF Mk III 25-Pounder field gun
M101A1 105mm towed field howitzer 
M102 105mm light towed field howitzer
M114A1 155mm towed field howitzer
Mle 1950 BF-50 155mm howitzer
M198 155mm howitzer
FH-70 155mm field howitzer
M1938 (M-30) 122mm howitzer
2A18 (D-30) 122mm howitzer
M1944 (BS-3) 100mm anti-tank and field gun
M1954 (M-46) 130mm towed field gun
Type 59-1 130mm field gun (Chinese-made gun deriveted from the Soviet M-46)
M1955 (D-20) 152mm towed gun-howitzer

Armoured vehicles

AMX-13 light tank (75mm, 90mm, and 105mm gun versions)
M41A3 Walker Bulldog light tank
Sherman Firefly medium tank
Sherman M-50 medium tank
T-34/85 medium tank
T-54A, T-54B and T-55A main battle tanks
T-62 main battle tank 
Ti-67 (Tiran 4 and Tiran 5) main battle tanks (Israeli-modified versions of the T-54/55)
M48A1 and M48A5 main battle tanks
Charioteer tank destroyer
SU-100 tank destroyer
M42A1 Duster SPAAG  
ZSU-23-4M1 Shilka SPAAG
Ferret armoured car
Shorland Mk 1 Patrol Car 
BRDM-2 amphibious armoured scout car
Cadillac Gage V-100 Commando armoured car
Staghound armoured car
Panhard AML-90 armoured car
Alvis Saladin armoured car
IAI/Ramta RAM-2V Armoured Reconnaissance Vehicle
IAI/Ramta RBY-2 Scout Armoured Reconnaissance Vehicle
Bravia V-200 Chaimite armoured car
UR-416 armoured car
BTR-152 armoured personnel carrier
BTR-50PK amphibious armoured personnel carrier
BTR-60PB armoured personnel carrier 
VAB armoured personnel carrier 
Alvis Saracen armoured personnel carrier
Panhard M3 VTT armoured personnel carrier 
M3/M9 Zahlam half-track
M59 armored personnel carrier
M113 armored personnel carrier and M113 ACAV
AMX-VCI armoured personnel carrier
BMP-1 armoured personnel carrier  
M577 command vehicle
M113 modified mortar carrier
M106 mortar carrier 
M125A2 mortar carrier
Makmat mortar carrier
Homebuilt armoured cars

Technicals, Gun trucks, transport and recovery vehicles
Hotchkiss M201 jeep (French-produced version of the Willys MB jeep)
Willys M38 MC jeep
Willys M38A1 MD jeep 
Willys CJ-3B jeep
Jeep CJ-5 and Jeep CJ-8 (Civilian versions of the Willys M38A1 MD jeep)
Keohwa M-5GA1 and Kia KM410 jeeps (South Korean-produced versions of the Willys M38A1 MD jeep) 
M151A1 and M151A2 ¼-ton utility trucks
GAZ-69A light truck
UAZ-469 light utility vehicle
Kaiser M715 jeep
VIASA MB-CJ6 jeep (Spanish-produced version of the Willys CJ-3B jeep)
Santana Series III (Spanish-produced version of the Land-Rover long wheelbase series III)
Santana 88 Ligero Military jeep 
Austin Champ light truck
Land-Rover short and long wheelbase series II-III
Range Rover first generation luxury Sport utility vehicle (SUV)
Morattab Series IV utility vehicle (Iranian-produced unlicensed version of the Land-Rover long wheelbase series III)
Pinzgauer 712M light all-terrain vehicle
Volvo Laplander L3314A light utility vehicle
Toyota Land Cruiser (J40) light pickup
Toyota Land Cruiser (J42) light pickup
Toyota Land Cruiser (J43) light pickup
Toyota Land Cruiser (J44) light pickup
Toyota Land Cruiser (J45) light pickup
Toyota Land Cruiser (J70) light pickup
Toyota Land Cruiser (J75) light pickup
Peugeot 404 light pickup
Peugeot 504 light pickup 
ACMAT TPK 4.20-NA12 utility truck 
Dodge M37 ¾ ton 4x4 1953 utility truck
Dodge WC51 light truck
Dodge Fargo/Power Wagon W200 light truck
Dodge D series (3rd generation) light pickup
Dodge Ram (1st generation) light pickup
GMC Sierra Custom K25/K30 light pickup 
Chevrolet C-10/C-15 Cheyenne light pickup
Chevrolet C-20 Scottsdale light pickup 
Chevrolet C/K 3rd generation pickup truck
Nissan Patrol 160-Series pickup (3rd generation)
Nissan/Datsun 620 pickup truck
Datsun 720 pickup truck
Suzuki Jimny LJ20 1st generation off-road mini SUV
Gurgel Sport utility vehicle (SUV)
Jeep Wagoneer full-size Sport utility vehicle (SUV)
Jeep Gladiator J20 pickup truck
M880/M890 Series CUCV
Toyota Dyna U10-series light-duty truck 
Toyota U10-series route van (minibus)
M718A1 military ambulance
Nissan Patrol 160-Series (3rd generation) 5-door wagon/van (used as military ambulance)
Chevrolet/GMC G-Series third generation van (used as military ambulance)
Volkswagen Type 2 Transporter minibus (used as military ambulance)
Volkswagen (Type 2) T3 Transporter van (used as military ambulance)
Volkswagen Type 2 Transporter Pickup
AIL M325 Command Car ("Nun-Nun": cargo A/B, combat patrol and ambulance versions)
Mercedes-Benz Unimog 406 and 416 light trucks
GAZ-66 light truck
Chevrolet C-50 medium-duty truck 
Dodge F600 medium-duty truck 
GMC K1500 medium-duty truck
GMC C4500 medium-duty truck
GMC C7500 heavy-duty truck 
Bedford RL lorry
GMC CCKW 2½-ton cargo truck
M34, M35A1 and M35A2 2½-ton cargo trucks  
ZIL-151 general-purpose truck
ZIL-157 general-purpose truck
ZIL-131 general-purpose truck
Ural-4320 AWD general purpose truck
Saviem SM8 TRM4000 truck
Berliet GBC 8KT heavy-duty truck
M813 5-ton cargo truck
Faun L912/21-MUN heavy cargo truck
M54A2 5-ton heavy cargo truck
KrAZ-255 heavy cargo truck
M5A1 artillery tractor
M816 5-ton medium wrecker truck
M88A1 medium recovery vehicle
M578 light recovery vehicle
T-34T Armoured Recovery Vehicle 
BTS-4 Armoured Recovery Vehicle
VT-55KS Armoured Recovery Vehicle
MAZ-537G tank transporter
Mack DM 800 tank transporter
XM523E2 Heavy Equipment Transporter (HET)
Ratrack dual track snow coach

Vehicle-borne improvised explosive devices
Car bomb 
Suicide truck-bomb

Helicopters
Aérospatiale SA 315B Lama II light helicopter
Aérospatiale SA 316B/C Alouette III light helicopter
Aérospatiale SA 330C Puma medium transport/utility helicopter
Aérospatiale SA 342K/L Gazelle helicopter (used mainly in the gunship role)
Agusta-Bell AB 212 utility transport

Aircraft
Dassault Mirage IIIEL fighter jet   
Potez CM.170R Fouga Magister jet trainer (used mainly in the fighter-bomber role)
Hawker Hunter FGA.70 and FGA.70A fighter jets (used mainly in the fighter-bomber role)
Scottish Aviation Bulldog T-1 Model 126 trainer (used also in the reconnaissance/observation role)

Naval craft
EDIC III-class Landing craft tank
EDIC9091-class Landing craft utility
LCU1466-class Landing craft utility
Aztec-class inshore patrol boat
Byblos-class oceanic patrol vessel
Fairey Marine Tracker MkII Class patrol boat
Dabur-1 class patrol boat
Dvora-class fast patrol boat
Rubber inflatable dinghy
Zodiac rubber inflatable boat
Converted civilian fishing craft (armed with Heavy machine-guns)

See also
Lebanese Ground Forces Equipment
Lebanese Armed Forces Out of Service Equipment
Lebanese Civil War
Lebanese Air Force aircraft inventory
Military equipment of Hezbollah
Syrian intervention in Lebanon
1958 Lebanon crisis
1982 Lebanon War

Notes

References

Alain Menargues, Les Secrets de la guerre du Liban: Du coup d'état de Béchir Gémayel aux massacres des camps palestiniens, Albin Michel, Paris 2004.  (in French)
Anthony Tucker-Jones, Images of War: T–54/55, The Soviet Army's Cold War main battle tank – rare photographs from wartime archives, Pen & Sword Military, Barnsley 2017. 
Bassel Abi-Chahine, The People's Liberation Army through the eyes of a lens, 1975–1991, Éditions Dergham, Jdeideh (Beirut) 2019. 
Beate Hamizrachi, The Emergence of South Lebanon Security Belt, Praeger Publishers Inc., New York 1984. 
Bill Gunston, An Illustrated Guide to Military Helicopters, Salamander Books Ltd, London 1981.  
Chris McNab, 20th Century Military Uniforms (2nd ed.), Grange Books, Kent 2002. 
Chris McNab, Soviet Submachine Guns of World War II: PPD-40, PPSh-41 and PPS, Weapon series 33, Osprey Publishing Ltd, Oxford 2014. 
Christopher F. Foss, Jane's Tank & Combat Vehicle recognition guide, HarperCollins Publishers, London 2002. 
Claire Hoy and Victor Ostrovsky, By Way of Deception: The Making and Unmaking of a Mossad Officer, St. Martin's Press, New York 1990. 
Dave Willey – Country Director-MAG, Landmines and Explosive Remnants of War in Lebanon, maginternational.org, Manchester 2016. – 
David Hirst, Beware of Small States: Lebanon, Battleground of the Middle East, Nation Books,  New York 2010. 
Edgar O'Ballance, Civil War in Lebanon, 1975-92, Palgrave Macmillan, London 1998. 
Éric Micheletti and Yves Debay, Liban – dix jours aux cœur des combats, RAIDS magazine n.º41, October 1989 issue.  (in French)
Éric Micheletti, Autopsie de la Guerre au Liban, RAIDS magazine n.º100, September 1994 special issue.  (in French)
Farid El-Kazen, The Breakdown of the State in Lebanon 1967-1976, I.B. Tauris, London 2000.  – 
Gordon L. Rottman, The Rocket-propelled Grenade, Weapon series 2, Osprey Publishing Ltd, Oxford 2010. 
Gordon L. Rottman, US Grenade Launchers – M79, M203, and M320, Weapon series 57, Osprey Publishing Ltd, Oxford 2017. 
Ian Hogg, Jane's Guns recognition guide, HarperCollins Publishers, London 2002. 
James Kinnear, Stephen Sewell & Andrey Aksenov, Soviet T-54 Main Battle Tank, General Military series, Osprey Publishing Ltd, Oxford 2018. 
James Kinnear, Stephen Sewell & Andrey Aksenov, Soviet T-55 Main Battle Tank, General Military series, Osprey Publishing Ltd, Oxford 2019. 
Jean Dunord, Liban: Les milices rendent leurs armes, RAIDS magazine n.º65, October 1991 issue.  (in French)
Jean Huon, Un Siècle d'Armement Mondial: Armes à feu d'infanterie de petit calibre, tome 4, Crépin-Leblond éditions, Chaumont 1981.  (in French)
Joseph A. Kechichian, The Lebanese Army: Capabilities and Challenges in the 1980s, Conflict Quarterly, Winter 1985.
Joseph Hokayem, L'armée libanaise pendant la guerre: un instrument du pouvoir du président de la République (1975-1985), Lulu.com, Beyrouth 2012. , 1291036601 (in French) – 
John C. Rolland (ed.), Lebanon: Current Issues and Background, Nova Science Publishers, Hauppauge, New York 2003.  – 
John Laffin, The War of Desperation: Lebanon 1982-85, Osprey Publishing Ltd, London 1985. 
John Walter, Walther Pistols – PP, PPK and P 38, Weapon series 82, Osprey Publishing Ltd, Oxford 2022. 
Jim Mesko, Don Greer and Perry Manley, M41 Walker Bulldog in action – Armor Number 29, Squadron/Signal Publications, Carrollton, Texas 1991. 
Samuel M. Katz and Ron Volstad, Battleground Lebanon (1003), Concord Publications, Hong Kong 1990. 
Samuel M. Katz, Lee E. Russel, and Ron Volstad, Armies in Lebanon 1982-84, Men-at-arms series 165, Osprey Publishing Ltd, London 1985. 
Samuel M. Katz and Ron Volstad, Arab Armies of the Middle East Wars 2, Men-at-arms series 194, Osprey Publishing Ltd, London 1988. 
Samer Kassis, 30 Years of Military Vehicles in Lebanon, Beirut: Elite Group, 2003. 
Samer Kassis, Véhicules Militaires au Liban/Military Vehicles in Lebanon 1975-1981, Trebia Publishing, Chyah 2012. 
Samer Kassis, Tiran in Lebanese Wars (Ammo_A.MIG-6000), AMMO of Mig Jimenez S.L., 2018. 
Samer Kassis, Les TIRAN 4 et 5, de Tsahal aux Milices Chrétiennes (1960-1990), Trucks & Tanks Magazine n.º 50, July–August 2015, pp. 54–61.  (in French)
Samer Kassis, Invasion of Lebanon 1982, Abteilung 502, 2019.  – 
Simon Dunstam, Terry Hadler and David E. Smith, The M113 series, Vanguard series 34, Osprey Publishing Ltd, London 1983. 
Steven J. Zaloga, Armour of the Middle East Wars 1948-78, Vanguard series 19, Osprey Publishing Ltd, London 1981. 
Steven J. Zaloga, ZSU-23-4 Shilka & Soviet Air Defense Gun Vehicles, Concord Publications, Hong Kong 1993. 
Steven J. Zaloga, Tank battles of the Mid-East Wars (2): The wars of 1973 to the present, Concord Publications, Hong Kong 2003.  – 
Steven J. Zaloga, Jim Kinnear and Peter Sarson, T-34-85 Medium Tank 1944-94, New Vanguard series 20, Osprey Publishing Ltd, Oxford 1996. 
Steven J. Zaloga and Peter Bull, Staghound armored car 1942-62, New Vanguard series 159, Osprey Publishing Ltd, Oxford 2000. 
Tony Badran (Barry Rubin ed.), Lebanon: Liberation, Conflict, and Crisis, Palgrave Macmillan, London 2010.   
Ken Guest, Lebanon, in Flashpoint! At the Front Line of Today's Wars, Arms and Armour Press, London 1994, pp. 97–111. 
Leroy Thompson, The G3 Battle Rifle, Weapon series 68, Osprey Publishing Ltd, Oxford 2019. 
Leigh Neville, Technicals: Non-Standard Tactical Vehicles from the Great Toyota War to modern Special Forces, New Vanguard series 257, Osprey Publishing Ltd, Oxford 2018. 
Moustafa El-Assad, Blue Steel: T-55 tanks in South Lebanon, Blue Steel books, Sidon 2006. 
Moustafa El-Assad, Blue Steel 2: M-3 Halftracks in South Lebanon, Blue Steel books, Sidon 2006. 
Moustafa El-Assad, Blue Steel III: M-113 Carriers in South Lebanon, Blue Steel books, Sidon 2007. 
Moustafa El-Assad, Blue Steel IV: M-50 Shermans and M-50 APCs in South Lebanon, Blue Steel books, Sidon 2007. 
Moustafa El-Assad, Civil Wars Volume 1: The Gun Trucks, Blue Steel books, Sidon 2008. 
M.P. Robinson, Peter Lau and Guy Gibeau, Images of War: The AMX 13 Light Tank, A Complete History – rare photographs from wartime archives, Pen & Sword Military, Barnsley 2018. 
N.R. Jenzen-Jones & Damien Spleeters, Identifying & Tracing the FN Herstal FAL Rifle: Documenting signs of diversion in Syria and beyond, Armament Research Services Pty. Ltd., Australia, August 2015.  – 
Paul Jackson, "Mirage III/5/50 Variant Briefing: Part 1: Dassault's Delta", World Air Power Journal, Volume 14, Autumn/Fall 1993, pp. 112–137, London: Aerospace Publishing. , 
Paul Jackson, Modern Combat Aircraft 23: Mirage, Shepperton, UK: Ian Allan, 1985. 
Paul Jureidini, R. D. McLaurin, and James Price, Military operations in selected Lebanese built-up areas, 1975-1978, Aberdeen, MD: U.S. Army Human Engineering Laboratory, Aberdeen Proving Ground, Technical Memorandum 11–79, June 1979.
Pedro Manuel Monteiro, Berliet, Chaimite e UMM – Os Grandes Veículos Militares Nacionais, Contra a Corrente, Lda., Lisboa 2018.  (in Portuguese)
Philipe Naud, La Guerre Civile Libanaise - 1re partie: 1975-1978, Steelmasters Magazine, August–September 2012, pp. 8–16.  (in French)
Philipe Naud, La Guerre Civile Libanaise - 2e partie: Les combats israélo-Syriens au Liban, 1982, Steelmasters Magazine, April–May 2013, pp. 8–15.  (in French)
Richard Lathrop, John McDonald and Jim Laurier, Cadillac Cage V-100 Commando 1960-71, New Vanguard series 52, Osprey Publishing Ltd, Oxford 2002. 
Yann Mahé, La Guerre Civile Libanaise, un chaos indescriptible (1975-1990), Trucks & Tanks Magazine n.º 41, January–February 2014, pp. 78–81.  (in French)
Zachary Sex & Bassel Abi-Chahine, Modern Conflicts 2 – The Lebanese Civil War, From 1975 to 1991 and Beyond, Modern Conflicts Profile Guide Volume II, AK Interactive, 2021. ISBN 8435568306073

External links
Histoire militaire de l'armée libanaise de 1975 à 1990 (in French)
Al-Mourabitoun vehicles in the Lebanese civil war
Lebanese Forces vehicles in the Lebanese civil war
Druze PLA vehicles in the Lebanese civil war
Lebanese Arab Army M113 APCs fitted with ZU-23-2 and Zastava M55 autocannons
Pre-1975 Lebanese Army vehicles

Lebanese Civil War
Lebanon-related lists
Lebanese Civil War
Lebanon